The Bathgate and Coatbridge Railway, also known as the "New Monkland Line", was built by Monkland Railways. It opened on 28 July 1863. The line was absorbed into the Edinburgh and Glasgow Railway on 31 July 1865. The following day (1 August 1865), the line became part of the North British Railway.

Closure
The last regular passenger train along this route between Glasgow and Edinburgh ran on 8 January 1956 (the line henceforth being closed to passengers east of Airdrie). Freight services continued until February 1982, then the line was lifted.

Connections to other lines 
At Greenside Junction (between Coatbridge Sunnyside and Coatdyke) to the Monkland and Kirkintilloch Railway
At Brownieside Junction to the Ballochney Railway
At Westcraigs to the Shotts branch of Wilsontown, Morningside and Coltness Railway
At Polkemmet Junction to the Wilsontown, Morningside and Coltness Railway

Reopening 

The section between Drumgelloch and Bathgate was reopened and electrified in October 2010, thus linking the current North Clyde Line with the Edinburgh to Bathgate Line. Work to reopen the line started with a sod cutting ceremony in June 2007.

References 

 
 
 
 Airdrie-Bathgate Rail Link

North British Railway
Railway lines opened in 1863
Railway companies disestablished in 1865
Coatbridge
Bathgate